City Rise is an inner suburb of the New Zealand city of Dunedin. One of the city's older suburbs, it is, as its name suggests, centred on the slopes which lie close to the city centre, particularly those closest to the city's original heart of The Exchange (for this reason, places are said to be on the City Rise rather than in City Rise). Extensive views across the central city can be gained from much of City Rise.

The name City Rise is generally applied to the area immediately to the west of Princes Street, especially to the approximately triangular area of one square kilometre bounded by Princes Street and the city's Town Belt, with Maitland Street and Stuart Street lying at the edge of the area. Some parts of the lower slopes at one time carried the name Fernhill, a term still occasionally encountered to refer to this area, arising from the name of the residence of an early settler, Captain Bellairs. Other notable streets on the City Rise include High Street, Rattray Street, Stafford Street, Arthur Street, Canongate, and Serpentine Avenue. The name City Rise is sometime used to cover a wider area extending further to the north along the inner edge of the Town Belt from Stuart Street and Moana Pool as far as the stately house Olveston and to the top of Pitt Street.

City Rise contains many of the city's earliest grand residences, notably along High Street and streets close to it. Many of these buildings were built on money which flowed into the infant city at the time of the Central Otago Gold Rush of 1861–1862. Notable houses include Threave (designed by Robert Lawson), Moata, and Colquhouns, among many others.

The suburb is bounded by the central city to the east and northeast, by Kensington to the south, and Mornington to the west. The small suburb of Belleknowes lies immediately to the north, beyond which is Roslyn.

The suburb is mainly residential, though it also has strong links with the city's education. Otago Boys' High School lies close to Stuart Street in the north of City Rise, and the original site of Otago Polytechnic (or, as it was at the time, King Edward Technical College) is also on the city rise side of Stuart Street. Otago Girls' High School is located closer to the city centre at the edge of City Rise. Arthur Street School is also located in the suburb, close to Otago Boys' High School.  Next to Arthur Street School's grounds is a monument on what was the site of Dunedin's first cemetery, Arthur Street Cemetery.

There is very little industry centred on City Rise, the most notable exception being Speight's Brewery, which is located at the foot of the rise close to the exchange. Immediately above this is St. Joseph's Cathedral, the city's Roman Catholic cathedral. Notable historical industrial connections with the suburb include Choie (Charles) Sew Hoy's importing company and the Kempthorne Prosser chemical manufacturing company, both of which had their main offices on Stafford Street.

From the 1880s until the 1950s, City Rise was served by Dunedin's cable tramway, with lines running up from the Exchange to the hill suburbs of Mornington and Roslyn via Stuart Street and Rattray Street. The tramway was notable for being only the second of its type in the world (after the San Francisco cable car system).

Belleknowes
Belleknowes is a smaller suburb, nestled within the Town Belt close to the points where City Rise, Mornington, and Roslyn meet. Its most notable feature is Belleknowes Golf Course, the closest golf course to the centre of Dunedin. A memorial seat dedicated to local historian Robert Gilkison overlooks the golf course with a view across the southern end of Otago Harbour to the suburb of Anderson's Bay.  Belleknowes is also the site of the historic housing development the Windle Settlement, 20 houses designed for workers and built in 1906, which is now a registered historic area. Also of note within the suburb are several parks such as Jubilee Park and Robin Hood Park, the latter of which is home to the Beverly-Begg Observatory.

Demographics

City Rise had a population of 7,041 at the 2018 New Zealand census, an increase of 456 people (6.9%) since the 2013 census, and an increase of 402 people (6.1%) since the 2006 census. There were 2,652 households. There were 3,573 males and 3,471 females, giving a sex ratio of 1.03 males per female, with 741 people (10.5%) aged under 15 years, 2,910 (41.3%) aged 15 to 29, 2,634 (37.4%) aged 30 to 64, and 762 (10.8%) aged 65 or older.

Ethnicities were 75.8% European/Pākehā, 8.1% Māori, 3.4% Pacific peoples, 17.8% Asian, and 4.0% other ethnicities (totals add to more than 100% since people could identify with multiple ethnicities).

The proportion of people born overseas was 30.9%, compared with 27.1% nationally.

Although some people objected to giving their religion, 54.2% had no religion, 32.1% were Christian, 2.4% were Hindu, 2.2% were Muslim, 1.4% were Buddhist and 3.2% had other religions.

Of those at least 15 years old, 2,358 (37.4%) people had a bachelor or higher degree, and 498 (7.9%) people had no formal qualifications. 816 people (13.0%) earned over $70,000 compared to 17.2% nationally. The employment status of those at least 15 was that 2,571 (40.8%) people were employed full-time, 1,185 (18.8%) were part-time, and 390 (6.2%) were unemployed.

Education
Arthur Street School is a state full primary school serving years 1 to 8 with a roll of  students. The school began on board the Philip Laing, and became first Beach School and then Middle School before moving to its present site and name in 1877. It was rebuilt in the 1960s.

St Joseph's Cathedral School is a state-integrated Catholic contributing primary school serving years 1 to 6 with a roll of  students. Kavanagh College is a state-integrated Catholic secondary school serving years 7 to 13 with a roll of  students. It was founded in 1989 as a merger between several Catholic schools, which had history from 1871.

St Hilda's Collegiate School is a state-integrated girls' school serving years 7 to 13 with a roll of  students. It was founded as an Anglican school in 1896, and moved to its current site in 1900.

Otago Boys' started in 1863 and Otago Girls' in 1871.

Rolls are as of

References

Suburbs of Dunedin